Jaguares de Córdoba is a professional Colombian football team based in Montería, that plays in the Categoría Primera A. They play their home games at the Jaraguay stadium.

History

The team was created on December 5, 2012 at a meeting held by team president Nelson Soto Duque, the mayor of Montería, and the governor of Córdoba. In an initiative led by the Montería city hall and the Córdoba government, with support from local companies, an agreement was reached with the direction to move Sucre F.C. from Sincelejo to Montería from 2013 under the name Jaguares de Córdoba.

Soto Duque is the major owner of the club that was founded in 1995 as Girardot. It has moved four times, and played under the names Deportes Palmira, Pacífico, Sucre, and finally Jaguares.

On February 3, 2013, the team debuted at the Primera B winning 2–1 against Real Cartagena, and the following year they earned promotion to the Categoría Primera A after winning the Torneo Postobón 2014-I by defeating América de Cali 5–1 on aggregate score in the final, and then beat 2014-II winners Deportes Quindío in the final of the year, winning 3–2 on aggregate score after losing the first leg 2–0 in the city of Armenia.

The best performance of the team in the top tier was achieved in the 2017 season. In the Torneo Apertura, the team placed 5th, thus qualifying for the knockout stage for the first time ever. The team was eliminated in the quarterfinals by Atlético Nacional. In the Torneo Finalización, the team placed 8th and qualified again for the knockout stage, again being eliminated in the quarterfinals, this time by Santa Fe. Jaguares ended the year placed 8th in the aggregate table, which qualified them to the 2018 Copa Sudamericana, the first time the team played in an international competition, losing to Boston River from Uruguay in the first stage.

Players

Current squad

Out on loan

Stadium

Honours
Categoría Primera B:
Winners (1): 2014

External links
 Official Site
 Jaguares de Córdoba Fútbol Club

See also
 Cultural significance of the jaguar in South America

References

Association football clubs established in 2012
Football clubs in Colombia
Categoría Primera A clubs
Categoría Primera B clubs